Urbana is a city in Benton County, Iowa, United States. The population was 1,554 at the time of the 2020 census. It is part of the Cedar Rapids Metropolitan Statistical Area.

History
Urbana (previously known as Hoosier Point and Marysville) was laid out in 1847.

Geography

Urbana is roughly midway between Cedar Rapids and Waterloo. Interstate 380 and Iowa Highway 150 intersect here.

Demographics

2010 census
As of the census of 2010, there were 1,458 people, 520 households, and 412 families living in the city. The racial makeup of the city was 97.5% White, 0.3% African American, 0.3% Asian, 0.2% from other races, and 1.7% from two or more races. Hispanic or Latino of any race were 1.0% of the population.

There were 520 households, of which 48.3% had children under the age of 18 living with them, 64.8% were married couples living together, 9.0% had a female householder with no husband present, 5.4% had a male householder with no wife present, and 20.8% were non-families. 15.6% of all households were made up of individuals, and 6.5% had someone living alone who was 65 years of age or older. The average household size was 2.80 and the average family size was 3.14.

The median age in the city was 32.1 years. 32.2% of residents were under the age of 18; 5.5% were between the ages of 18 and 24; 35% were from 25 to 44; 19.6% were from 45 to 64; and 7.6% were 65 years of age or older. The gender makeup of the city was 50.5% male and 49.5% female.

2000 census
As of the census of 2000, there were 1,019 people, 372 households, and 284 families living in the city. The racial makeup of the city was 99.61% White, 0.29% African American and 0.10% Native American. Hispanic or Latino of any race were 0.59% of the population.

There were 372 households, out of which 43.0% had children under the age of 18 living with them, 66.9% were married couples living together, 5.4% had a female householder with no husband present, and 23.4% were non-families. 18.8% of all households were made up of individuals, and 9.1% had someone living alone who was 65 years of age or older. The average household size was 2.74 and the average family size was 3.13.

30.5% were under the age of 18, 8.2% from 18 to 24, 38.0% from 25 to 44, 13.9% from 45 to 64, and 9.3% were 65 years of age or older. The median age was 31 years. For every 100 females, there were 100.6 males. For every 100 females age 18 and over, there were 98.9 males.

The median income for a household in the city was $49,063, and the median income for a family was $54,327. Males had a median income of $35,682 versus $23,750 for females. The per capita income for the city was $18,005. About 0.7% of families and 1.1% of the population were below the poverty line, including none of those under age 18 and 5.1% of those age 65 or over.

Education
Urbana is within the Center Point–Urbana Community School District. The district formed on July 1, 1993, with the merger of the Center Point and Urbana districts.

Notable person

Cal Eldred, MLB pitcher

References

External links

  
City-Data Comprehensive Statistical Data and more about Urbana

Cities in Benton County, Iowa
Cities in Iowa
Cedar Rapids, Iowa metropolitan area
1847 establishments in Iowa